The FW de Klerk Foundation is a nonpartisan organisation that was established in 1999 by former South African president Frederik Willem de Klerk.

It promotes activities in "multi-community" countries and seeks to nurture the democracy of South Africa. Its foundational principles are based upon those of the South African constitution, multi-party democracy and free-market economics. It aims are to support and promote the constitution, promote unity in diversity, support charities that care for disabled and disadvantaged children and provide information on de Klerk's presidency.

The Executive Director of the Foundation is Dr Theuns Eloff (as of 1 July 2016).  The Foundation was involved in 2006 in the resolution of tensions concerning a directive by the Police Commissioner in the Western Cape Province that English be the sole language medium for police documentation even in primarily non-English speaking areas of the Province.

The Foundation also incorporates the Centre for Constitutional Rights (CFCR). The CFCR seeks to promote the values, rights and principles of the Constitution, to monitor developments including policy and draft legislation that might affect the Constitution and the values, rights or principles provided therein, to inform people and organisations of their constitutional rights and to assist them in claiming their rights. The CFCR is headed by Ms Phephelaphi Dube (as of 1 May 2016) as Director of the CFCR and advised by an eminent group of constitutional experts under the patronage of the Honourable Justice Ian Farlam, retired judge of the Supreme Court of Appeal.

References

External links
 FW de Klerk Foundation
 Centre for Constitutional Rights
 Partner: Konrad-Adenauer-Foundation South Africa

Organizations established in 2000